Mali Airways was an airline based in Mali. Mali Airways should not be mistaken for Mali Air, an Austrian business aviation company.
It was never launched.

References

Defunct airlines of Mali
Airlines established in 2015
Airlines disestablished in 2015
Companies based in Bamako
2015 establishments in Mali
Proposed airlines